Victor Joseph (born 21 February 1951) is a Grenadian cricketer. He played in six first-class and two List A matches for the Windward Islands from 1972 to 1976.

See also
 List of Windward Islands first-class cricketers

References

External links
 

1951 births
Living people
Grenadian cricketers
Windward Islands cricketers